Ann Eden Woodward (born Evangeline Lucille Crowell; December 12, 1915 – October 10, 1975) was an American socialite, showgirl, model, and radio actress. In 1940, while working as a nightclub dancer and radio actress, she was voted "The Most Beautiful Girl in Radio". 

Woodward became a prominent and controversial figure in New York high society after her marriage to banking heir William Woodward Jr. Although never convicted, she was suspected of murder after she shot and killed her husband in 1955, claiming that she had mistaken him for a burglar. The circumstances surrounding her husband's death led to Woodward becoming a cause célèbre and, later, being banished from high society. Life called the event "The Shooting of the Century". In 1975, Truman Capote published excerpts from an unfinished novel Answered Prayers, which accused Woodward of murdering her husband. Just before the stories were to be published in Esquire, she killed herself by taking cyanide.

Biography 
Woodward was born Evangeline Lucille Crowell on December 12, 1915 in Pittsburg, Kansas to Colonel M. Jesse Crowell, a streetcar conductor and retired military officer from Detroit, Michigan, and his wife. She attended Kansas City Junior College for one year. As a young adult, she moved to Kansas City and changed her name to Ann Eden after her parents divorced and remarried. 

In 1937, Woodward moved to New York City to work as a model and actress and was signed with John Robert Powers modeling agency. Through the Powers agency, Woodward landed roles as a radio actress, and was voted "The Most Beautiful Girl in Radio" in 1940. She had a role in Sir Noël Coward's Set to Music.

While working as a showgirl at FeFe's Monte Carlo, a nightclub in New York City, Woodward met William Woodward Sr., a wealthy banker from a prominent old money family who served as Chairman of the Central Hanover Bank & Trust. It is speculated that she became Woodward's mistress. She was later courted by Woodward's son, William Woodward Jr., and married him in 1943 at St Luke's Memorial Episcopal Church in Tacoma, Washington. The marriage was a controversial one, and she was initially shunned by New York high society. Her mother-in-law, Elizabeth Ogden Cryder Woodward, objected to the marriage. Woodward was eventually welcomed into prominent social circles and became a leading figure in society. She had two sons with her husband, William Woodward III and James Woodward.

The Woodwards' marriage was an unhappy one, both having strings of affairs. Her husband asked for a divorce in 1947, but Woodward refused.

Shooting, aftermath, and suicide 
In late 1955, there were a string of burglaries in the Woodwards' neighborhood in Oyster Bay. On October 30, 1955 Woodward and her husband returned to their country estate after attending a party hosted by Florence Tucker Baker in honor of the Duke and Duchess of Windsor. Sleeping in separate bedrooms, later that night Ann fired a shotgun twice, killing her husband. She claimed she had mistaken him for a burglar. She was not indicted for the shooting, and a Nassau County grand jury deemed the event an accident. The shooting led to Woodward becoming a cause célèbre in New York, and was referred to by Life as "The Shooting of the Century". Although never proven guilty of murder, Woodward was shunned by high society for the rest of her life. She and her sons moved in with her mother-in-law.

In 1975, Truman Capote published excerpts of his unfinished novel Answered Prayers in Esquire, which scandalized high society. The novel's characters were based on Capote's real-life acquaintances who were prominent socialites of the time. The novel revealed scandals and issues within the lives of William S. Paley, Babe Paley, Happy Rockefeller, Gloria Vanderbilt, and Woodward. In the novel, Capote based a character named Ann Cutler, a bigamist and gold digger who shoots her husband, on Woodward's killing of her husband, implying that it was murder. Answered Prayers caused such a scandal prior to its release that Woodward killed herself by taking cyanide later that year. Her body was discovered on October 10, 1975 in her apartment on Fifth Avenue. Her mother-in-law said of her death, "she shot my son, and Truman just murdered her, and so now I suppose we don't have to worry about that anymore." Subsequently, both of Woodward's sons committed suicide; James in 1976 and William in 1999. The incident was also portrayed in Dominick Dunne's 1985 novel The Two Mrs. Grenvilles, which was turned into a television miniseries in 1987.

Woodward's funeral took place at St. James Episcopal Church on the Upper East Side. She was buried in the Woodward family plot at Woodlawn Cemetery in the Bronx.

References 

1915 births
1975 suicides
20th-century American actresses
20th-century American dancers
Actresses from Kansas
American female dancers
American female murderers
American radio actresses
American showgirls
American socialites
Burials at Woodlawn Cemetery (Bronx, New York)
Female models from Kansas
People from Pittsburg, Kansas
Suicides by cyanide poisoning
Woodward family
20th-century American Episcopalians
Suicides in New York City